Michael Wilmer Forbes Tweedie (2 September 1907 – 1993) was a naturalist and archaeologist working in South East Asia, who was Director of the Raffles Museum in Singapore.

Biography 
Tweedie was the son of Maurice Carmichael Tweedie, who was Deputy Inspector-General in the Imperial Indian Police Service, and his wife Mildred Clarke.

He read Natural Science at Cambridge University, specializing in zoology and geology, followed by a short spell working as an oil geologist in Venezuela. He became assistant curator of the Raffles Museum (now the National University of Singapore's Lee Kong Chian Natural History Museum) in 1932 until the Japanese occupation in 1941. After the end of World War II, he became Director of the museum in 1946, remaining in that post until 1971. Tweedie was involved in many biological and archaeological expeditions in South East Asia and collected many specimens himself. Many of Tweedie's collections were of species that proved to be new to science (such as a leech, Phytobdella catenifera). He also wrote many scientific articles particularly regarding crustaceans, fish, and reptiles. He also wrote many books to encourage the layman in the study of natural history and archaeology. He was made an honorary member of the Malayan Nature Society.

Tweedie married Elvira Toby, of Hobart, Australia, in 1938, and they had a son and two daughters.

Legacy
Tweedie is commemorated in the scientific name of a species of Malaysian snake, Macrocalamus tweediei.

Bibliography
Editor of the Malaysian Nature Handbooks series published by Longman Malaysia.
Tweedie MWF (1953). "The Stone Age in Malaya". Journal of the Malayan Branch Royal Asiatic Society 26 (2): 1-90. 
Tweedie MWF, Harrison JL (1954). Malayan Animal Life. Longman.
Tweedie MWF (1983). The Snakes of Malaya. Singapore: Singapore National Printers Ltd. 105 pp. ASIN B0007B41IO.

References

1907 births
1993 deaths
Natural history of Indonesia
English archaeologists
British carcinologists
British curators
British expatriates in Singapore
Museum directors
Alumni of the University of Cambridge
20th-century British zoologists
British expatriates in Venezuela